Isa Mammetgulyyev (born 8 January 1997) is a Turkmen tennis player.

Mammetgulyyev has a career high ATP singles ranking of 1115 achieved on 25 July 2016. He also has a career high ATP doubles ranking of 1189, achieved on 19 September 2016.
 
Mammetgulyyev has represented Turkmenistan at Davis Cup, where he has a win–loss record of 18–11.

He played at the 2014 Asian Games on Mixed doubles with Anastasiýa Prenko and Men's team event.

He participated at the 2017 Asian Indoor and Martial Arts Games in Ashgabat, Turkmenistan. In singles he lost at the second round against Hong Kongese Wong Hong Kit. In doubles with Ýuriý Rogusskiý lost against the latest silver medalist Kazakhs duo (Timur Khabibulin-Denis Yevseyev) on the first round. In Mixed doubles with Anastasiýa Prenko lost against the latest champion on the quarter-final.

Personal life 
Isa Mammetgulyyev was born in Ashgabat, Turkmenistan. He is studying in Bratislava, Slovakia.

Mammetgulyyev trains at the tennis academy of Dominika Cibulková.

Davis Cup

Participations: (11–10)

   indicates the outcome of the Davis Cup match followed by the score, date, place of event, the zonal classification and its phase, and the court surface.

References

Sources 
 
 
 

1997 births
Living people
Turkmenistan male tennis players
Tennis players at the 2014 Asian Games
Asian Games competitors for Turkmenistan